The American Student Government Association (ASGA) was founded in 2001 as a professional association for collegiate student governments and student government associations across the United States.

History 
ASGA was founded by Oxendine Publishing, Inc., which published Student Leader magazine, books, and web sites on student leadership.

ASGA's research and experts  have been referenced in hundreds of newspapers nationwide. " ASGA's "SG Database" gathers information on trends in higher education, including the number of women and ethnic minorities, as well as trends in election turnout, and compensation paid to elected student government officers and members

ASGA Membership 
ASGA has over 1,500 member student governments at the nearly 4,500 institutions across the United States.

ASGA Events 
Since 2005, ASGA has produced 140 conferences for student government leaders and advisors. 3,000 students and administrators attend 11 ASGA conferences each year. 700 student leaders attend the National Student Government Summit annually.

ASGA Mission 
The American Student Government Association will provide all Student Government leaders and advisors nationwide with networking, research, and information resources and will teach them how to become more effective, ethical, and influential leaders on their campuses. ASGA also will promote the advancement of SGs, conduct research as the nation's only "SG Think Tank," and advocate the importance of having a vibrant, autonomous Student Government organization at every institution in America.

External links 
American Student Government Association. ASGA is the professional association for collegiate Student Government across the United States.
Student Leader magazine. Founded in 1992, Student Leader was ASGA's official member magazine, but also had subscribers at more than 1,000 colleges and universities nationwide.

References

Groups of students' unions
Student governments in the United States
Education-related professional associations